Neustadt (Wied) or Neustadt an der Wied is a municipality in the district of Neuwied in Rhineland-Palatinate, Germany. It is situated about 30 kilometres (20 miles) south-east of Bonn in the Rhine-Westerwald Nature Park. Neustadt is part of the Asbach collective municipality.

References

External links

 Gemeinde Neustadt/Wied
 Verbandsgemeinde Asbach

Neuwied (district)